The first inauguration of Jakaya Kikwete as the 4th President of Tanzania took place on Wednesday, 21 December 2005. It marked the commencement of the first five-year term of Jakaya Kikwete as President and Ali Mohamed Shein as Vice President. 

Kikwete won the 2005 presidential election by a landslide receiving 80.28 percent of the popular vote.

Attendance

Dignitaries

References

External links
 Kikwete's inaugural speech
 Presidential group photograph at Michuzi Blog

Jakaya Kikwete
Tanzanian presidential inaugurations